(1491–1545) was the successor of Hatakeyama Yoshimoto. This succession took place during the year 1515. For Yoshifusa to consolidate his power, he reinforced Nanao Castle and established himself there . Yoshifusa was a patron to scholars, and invited various scholars from Kyoto to lecture at Nanao. Yoshifusa was indeed a very capable leader. The Noto Hatakeyama enjoyed relative peace and stability as Yoshifusa was under their rule.

References

Hatakeyama clan
1491 births
1545 deaths